Patshull Hall is a substantial Georgian mansion house situated near Pattingham in Staffordshire, England. It is a Grade I listed building and by repute is one of the largest listed buildings in the county.

History
The Hall was built to designs by architect James Gibbs for Sir John Astley in about 1730. The main façade is of three storeys with seven bays, three of which are pedimented, and tower wings. The west wing, of monolithic proportions, has four storeys. The house was set in a park of some  created by Capability Brown and including a large serpentine lake.

The estate was acquired for £100,000 in 1765 by Sir George Pigot, ( Baron Pigot from 1766), on his retirement as Governor of Madras. The Pigot family sold the property to William Legge, 5th Earl of Dartmouth in 1848, whose son and heir Viscount Lewisham took residence. Substantial extensions and improvements were carried out for him by architect William Burn in the 1880s. The Legges later moved their seat to Plas Newydd on Anglesey.

During the 20th century the house served as a rehabilitation centre in the 1940s and then until the 1980s as an orthopaedic hospital. In 1990 the estate was broken up and many acres were sold for the creation of a golf course; a classical temple created by Capability Brown was converted to become the clubhouse.  

During the 1990s the house fell into disrepair and was briefly used as a school. In 1996 the house had suffered extensive decay and had deteriorated so badly that it appeared on the English heritage list of Buildings at Risk.

Patshull Hall was bought in 1997 by Neil Avery, a renovation specialist and entrepreneur, as a restoration project and the house was subsequently removed from the Buildings at Risk register. The renovated Hall was later  purchased in 2015. The house is being further renovated and is now used as a private family home. 
The hall has now been split into two with the west wing put up for sale both in 2017 and 2023.

See also
 List of Grade I listed buildings in Staffordshire
 Listed buildings in Pattingham and Patshull

References
https://www.neilaverygroup.com/ Classical Ruin Rescue]
  English Heritage; Images of England, photograph and architectural description of listed building
 Patshull Hall entry from The DiCamillo Companion to British & Irish Country Houses
  English Heritage; Images of England, photograph 
  English Heritage; Images of England, photograph South front
  Staffordshire Past Track
Evolution History : Patshull Hall

Grade I listed buildings in Staffordshire
James Gibbs buildings
Houses completed in 1730
Country houses in Staffordshire
South Staffordshire District